Daniel Brands was the defending champion but decided not to participate.
Dominik Meffert won the title, defeating Nils Langer 6–4, 6–3 in the final.

Seeds

Draw

Finals

Top half

Bottom half

References
 Main Draw
 Qualifying Draw

Oberstaufen Cup - Singles
2012 Singles